The 1973 New Mexico Lobos football team was an American football team that represented the University of New Mexico in the Western Athletic Conference (WAC) during the 1973 NCAA Division I football season.  In their sixth season under head coach Rudy Feldman, the Lobos compiled a 4–7 record (3–4 against WAC opponents) and were outscored by a total of 287 to 257.

Rich Diller, Don Woods, and Don Hubbard were the team captains. The team's statistical leaders included Don Woods with 869 passing yards, 971 rushing yards, and 66 points scored, and Paul Labarrere with 374 receiving yards.

Schedule

References

New Mexico
New Mexico Lobos football seasons
New Mexico Lobos football